Matej Baloga (born 8 August 1997) is a Slovak biathlete. He competed in the 2022 Winter Olympics. Baloga won his first international medal at the 2021 Summer World Championships, winning silver in the sprint.

Biathlon results
All results are sourced from the International Biathlon Union.

World Championships
0 medals

*During Olympic seasons competitions are only held for those events not included in the Olympic program.
**The single mixed relay was added as an event in 2019.

References

1997 births
Living people
Slovak male biathletes
Olympic biathletes of Slovakia
Sportspeople from Prešov
Biathletes at the 2022 Winter Olympics